China declared its baselines for its maritime territory on 15 May 1996. The baselines were for the Chinese mainland and also for the Paracel (Xisha) Islands.

The baselines for the mainland consist of a series of straight lines linking 49 basepoints situated on the outer edge along and outer islands off the coast of China. For the Paracel Islands, the baselines consist of a series of straight lines linking 28 basepoints located on the outer islands of the group.

Baselines legislation and principles
The 1996 declaration of China's baselines is based on its law on its territorial sea and the contiguous zone which was adopted on 25 February 1992. Dongyin, Dongsha, Wuqiuyu and Dongdingdao etc. are part of the Republic of China's (Taiwan) Lienchiang County and Kinmen County.

Basepoints

Mainland

Paracel Islands

See also 

 Nine-dash line

References